Crassatina is a genus of  saltwater clams, marine bivalve molluscs in the family Crassatellidae of the order Carditida.

Species
 Crassatina alba Cosel, 1995
 Crassatina congoensis (Jaeckel & Thiele, 1931)
 Crassatina contraria (Gmelin, 1791)
 Crassatina corrugata (A. Adams & Reeve, 1850)
 Crassatina dakarensis Cosel, 1995
 Crassatina fusca (Kobelt, 1886)
 Crassatina guineensis Cosel & Gofas, 2018
 † Crassatina inornata Wild & L. C. King, 1932 
 Crassatina marchadi Cosel, 1995
 Crassatina modesta (H. Adams, 1869)
 † Crassatina nummaria Powell, 1931 
 Crassatina ornata (Gray in Griffith & Pidgeon, 1833)
 Crassatina paeteli (Maltzan, 1885)
 † Crassatina senecta Powell, 1931
 Crassatina triquetra (Reeve, 1842)
Synonyms
 Crassatina bellula (A. Adams, 1854): synonym of Talabrica bellula (A. Adams, 1854)
 Crassatina capensis (Lamy, 1917): synonym of Crassatella capensis Lamy, 1917
 Crassatina iredalei (Powell, 1958): synonym of Salaputium iredalei Powell, 1958
 Crassatina planata (Calcara, 1840): synonym of Crassatina modesta (H. Adams, 1869)
  Crassatina sowerbyi (Lamy, 1917): synonym of Crenocrassatella sowerbyi (Lamy, 1917)
 Crassatina suduirauti Lamprell, 2003: synonym of Chattina suduirauti (Lamprell, 2003) (original combination)

References

External links
  Gofas, S.; Le Renard, J.; Bouchet, P. (2001). Mollusca. in: Costello, M.J. et al. (eds), European Register of Marine Species: a check-list of the marine species in Europe and a bibliography of guides to their identification. Patrimoines Naturels. 50: 180-213

Crassatellidae
Bivalve genera